The following elections occurred in the year 1873.

Africa

Liberia

 1873 Liberian general election

North America

Canada
 1873 Newfoundland general election
 1873 Prince Edward Island general election

United States
 1873 New York state election
 United States Senate election in New York, 1873

Oceania

New Zealand

 1873 Lyttelton by-election

See also
 :Category:1873 elections

1873
Elections